Omalus puncticollis is a species of insect belonging to the family Chrysididae.

Synonym:
 Omalus aeneus puncticollis

References

Chrysididae